The cuisine of Québec (also called "French Canadian cuisine" or "cuisine québécoise") is a national cuisine in the Canadian province of Québec. It is also cooked by Franco-Ontarians.

Québec's cuisine is descended from 16th-century French cuisine and began to develop in New France from the labour-intensive nature of colonial life, the seasonality of ingredients and the need to conserve resources. It has been influenced by the province's history of fur trading and hunting, as well as Québec's winters, soil fertility, teachings from First Nations, British cuisine, American cuisine, historical trade relations and some immigrant cuisines. 

Québec is home to many unique dishes and is most famous for its poutine, tourtières, pâté chinois, pea soup, fèves au lard, cretons and desserts such as grands-pères, pouding chômeur and St. Catherine's taffy. Québec's unique dishes are the traditional fare of the holidays, as well as the temps des sucres, a time in March where families go to sugar shacks.

Québec is known for being the biggest producer of maple syrup on the planet, as 72% of the maple syrup sold in the world (and 90% sold in Canada) originates from Québec. The province is also recognized for having created over 700 different kinds of cheese, some of which have won international contests.

Food critic Jacob Richler wrote that Québec's cuisine is better defined than that of the rest of Canada, due to its language barrier with the dominant culture of the United States and having had more time to develop. Conversely, Québec's cuisine and Acadian cuisine have much in common due to proximity and a shared language and history.

History 
The cuisine of Québec evolved from that of 16th-century Northern France. It also retains some heritage from Poitevin cuisine: many Québecois make pâté marmite; soupe aux gourganes, which is based on gourgane beans, a strain of fava bean; and soups based on other legumes. Charentaise chowders (chaudrées charentaises) have evolved into the quiaudes of Gaspesia and the tourtes salées of Poitiers into tourtières.

Other foods that originate from France are pot-au-feu; blood sausage (boudin); head cheese (tête fromagée); plorine sausages; ham hock stew (ragoût de pattes de cochon); rabbit stew (civet de lapin); French toast (pain perdu or pain doré); and pastries like crêpes, beignets, croquignole biscuits, and tarts. As in France, pork is the most popular meat.

From the moment they arrived in the early 17th century, French colonists always preferred their native cuisine. However, they learned some culinary techniques from the Algonquins, Atikamekw and Iroquois. The most important ones were l’acériculture (the process of harvesting maple sap and creating maple syrup), ice fishing, and boucanage (in which fish or other meat is smoked for preservation and flavour).

Food preservation was always important in pioneer times, due to long winters and to the frequent voyages of coureurs des bois. Butter, herbs, and lard were used for seasoning and salting. Pork and fish were boucanés, while other meats and vegetables were preserved in vinegar. These techniques are still practiced today, though not for survival. Pioneers and their descendants also hunted and fished for sustenance.

By the 1670s, a substantial agrarian population had emerged in the region of Québec City, and French habits dominated. Meals almost always featured soup, bread, meat, and wine. Since the climate made it difficult to grow grapes, wines were always imported from France.

The Conquest of New France in 1760 brought some culinary changes to Québec. One of the immediate effects was the elimination of wine, as it could no longer be imported from France. Another major change was the importation of the potato, which, in only a few decades, became a staple ingredient in Québec, dethroning  bread in popularity. Sugar consumption also increased. Finally, the British imported many recipes like mashed potatoes, crumble, and meat pies.

The period following the Aroostook War in 1839 resulted in increased interaction between Québec and New England. Some recipes inspired by the cultural exchange included fèves au lard, ketchup maison, and date squares. The socio-economic standing of French Canadians also fell to deplorable levels; the intense poverty pushed them to simplify their meals. Recipes for bouillon were now almost nothing more than warm water. Alcoholic beverages were rarely consumed, and butter was either used sparingly or absent. Some famine foods like ploye emerged during this period.

By the early 1900s, conditions had improved somewhat, though French Canadians were still poor. Most families would often eat a mix of potatoes and pork on their plate, which is still a staple combination today. During this period, the passenger pigeon, called tourte in French, also became extinct. Because this bird's meat had been used to fill the pie-like pastries known as tourtières, the tourtière recipe had to change. Mostly, farm-raised meats like beef and pork were used as the substitutes.

The Great Depression of the 1930s saw the creation of new recipes like pâté chinois ("Chinese pie") and pouding chômeur ("unemployed man's pudding") that were delicious and cost-conscious. Immigration after this period diversified; immigrants no longer came only from the British Isles but also from other parts of Europe. Jewish specialties like bagels and Eastern Europe-style smoked meat became popular, resulting in the creation of Montréal-style smoked meat and Montréal-style bagels.

The 1950s saw many changes in the eating habits of the Québécois, for a variety of reasons. Many American fast-food companies and restaurants expanded in Québec, raw milk was banned, many fruits and vegetables became available throughout the year, and Québécois no longer needed to hunt and fish for sustenance. As a result, the pain de ménage ("household bread"), the traditional Québécois bread, was replaced with pain à sandwich; many old cheese recipes were abandoned and new ones created; and spaghetti, pizza, turkey, bacon, sausages, industrial cheeses, hamburgers, hot dogs, french fries, coleslaw, lobster rolls all become popular. 

In the late 1950s, these changes brought about the creation of poutine—arguably the most famous Québécois dish—as well as other dishes, like hot chicken and guédilles.

The Quiet Revolution of the 1960s to 1970s greatly improved the socio-economic standing of French Canadians. This allowed them to have a more diverse diet. It also set the stage for high-quality products to be created in Québec and for the emergence of Québécois restaurants, like Lafleur, Valentine, La Belle Province, Chez Ashton, Chez Cora and St-Hubert.

From the 1980s to today, the various regions of Québec have been developing unique regional dishes and products like native varieties of wine and cheese. Immigration from Europe, particularly Italy and Greece in the mid- to late twentieth century, and more recently France and Portugal, has given rise to the creation and production of high-quality cheeses and alcoholic beverages across Québec and a return to recipes of the terroir.

Ingredients

Game, seafood, and fish 
Historical poverty led many families in Québec to hunt in order to feed themselves until the 1950s. Tourtières, as noted above, were historically stuffed with the meat of the tourte, or passenger pigeon, which was common and easy prey for early Québécois. It is said that they flew in such large flocks, a hunter needed only to point his gun upward to bring one down. But, by the early 20th century, the passenger pigeon became extinct due to overhunting, deforestation, and the Allee effect.

Subsequently, families instead used whatever meat they had on hand, usually from livestock. As a result, most modern tourtières are filled with beef or pork. Today, the consumption of game remains a tradition, although game is not sold in grocery stores. When available, Québécois eat meat from moose, deer, hares, ruffed grouse, or waterfowl rather than that of livestock. Game is also sometimes given as a gift.

As for seafood, lobster and crab are caught in Gaspesia, la Côte-Nord, and the Magdalen Islands to be sold to the rest of Québec. Shrimp is often marketed as crevette de Matane after the shrimp-processing factory in the town of Matane. However, the shrimp themselves are caught in several villages on the Saint Lawrence River estuary. Mussels, oysters, scallops, and whelks (bourgots)  are also caught.

Salmon and trout are the most popular fish in Québec. The brook trout is nearly ubiquitous, salmon is farmed and can be caught in 118 different rivers, and Arctic char is present across nearly 100 lakes. Other fished species include lake trout, yellow perch, walleye, muskellunge, Northern pike, micropterus, rainbow smelt, Greenland halibut, mackerel, lake sturgeon, lake whitefish, Atlantic cod (Eastern Québec), Atlantic herring (Eastern Québec), American eel (between Trois-Rivières and Cap-Chat), ouananiche (a kind of freshwater salmon; Lac Saint-Jean), frostfish (Sainte-Anne-de-la-Pérade), deepwater redfish (Saguenay fjords), capelin (coastal villages), and brown bullhead (Îles de Sorel).

Sainte-Anne-de-la-Pérade holds a world-renowned festival every December to February called La pêche des petits poisons des chenaux, where ice fishers catch tomcods. Historically, starving French colonists learned ice fishing techniques from the Atikamekw—a privilege, as the technique was kept a secret from neighbouring First Nations.

Livestock 
Pork is the meat used most often in Québécois recipes. Beef is also commonly used but has been losing popularity in recent years. In summer, beef commonly features in barbecues. While horse meat is consumed marginally, Québec is still the place in North America where it is most commonly eaten.

Québécois pigs are mostly hybrids of the duroc, Yorkshire, and American Landrace breeds. The cattle are also hybrids of many breeds; the Aberdeen Angus, Charolais, and Limousin are the most common. Despite the large cattle population, Québec imports most of its beef from the Canadian West, using its own cattle mostly for dairy. Milk production is dominated by the Holstein, but Jersey or Brown Swiss cows are also milked. The Canadienne is an ancestral breed of Québécois cattle that was once widely raised in the province. There are still a few hundred of these cows left in the Charlevoix and Magdalen Islands regions. Their milk is used in artisanal cheeses.

Poultry is very commonly consumed in Québec. The most popular types are chicken and turkey. The ancestral Chantecler chicken, developed in Oka the early 20th century, is now on the market once again. Turkey is traditionally served at Christmas and Thanksgiving with croutons and sage. Chicken eggs are very popular and mostly used at breakfast and to make pastries. The Estrie region has produced duck since the early 20th century. Québec is also the only producer of foie gras in Canada, as well as its largest producer in North America.

Other meats include lamb, veal, and frog legs (from American bullfrogs and leopard frogs).

Spices, vegetables, and fruits 
Québécois cook with butter. Salt can replace or be combined with herbs for seasoning. Spices common in traditional recipes are linked to local production and historical commerce: savory, cloves, cinnamon, parsley, thyme, sage, nutmeg, quatres épices, and bay leaf. In recent years, spices with provenance in the boreal forest have appeared on Québécois tables, among them green alder pepper (poivre des dunes or poivre d'aulne), sweetfern (comptonie voyageuse), caraway seed (carvi sauvage), sweetgale, and juniper berry. Chefs create interest in and excitement for these new flavours in cooking.

Maple syrup is used to sweeten breakfasts, meats, and pastries. Traditional grains are wheat and buckwheat; their flours are not just used to make bread and dough, but sauces and ragoûts. Buckwheat became popular because it could grow well on the Canadian Shield.

The most commonly used vegetables in traditional Québécois cuisine were those that can easily be preserved to last throughout the winter, either kept in a cool storage area like a root cellar or brined in jars. These vegetables are the potato, onion, carrot, beet, squash, legumes, cabbage, turnip, and corn. Today, Québécois also cook with the tomato, bell pepper, cucumber, lettuce, asparagus, cauliflower, broccoli, and other newer vegetables. Rhubarb, fiddleheads, and chives are consumed seasonally. Rhubarb and chives are often grown in backyard gardens, while fiddleheads are gathered in the wild.

The most popular berries are the blueberry, strawberry, raspberry, cherry, cranberry, gadelle, and cloudberry. They are used in jams and jellies, spreads, gelées, desserts, juices, and alcoholic beverages. Blackcurrants and blue honeysuckle have recently entered Québécois markets. Other important fruits are the apple, pear, and plum. Apples are especially important because they are used to make cider and are the star of le temps des pommes.

Imported citrus fruits and tropical fruits are also often enjoyed today. In the past, however, they were so expensive they would be bought only for special events or as a gift. It was customary to give children an orange for Christmas.

Mushrooms have long been absent from Québec's traditional cuisine and culinary history. Today, when mushrooms are used, they are usually of the cremini variety. In recent years, devoted cooks have introduced indigenous species into their culinary creations. Morchella and chanterelle mushrooms are gaining more and more popularity as a result.

Finally, some ingredients like rice, molasses, raisins, and brown sugar appear in traditional Québécois recipes because of historical commerce between New France and regions like the Antilles and Brazil.

Examples of unique dishes

Entrées or sides 
 Betteraves marinées—pickled beets
 Cretons—forcemeat-style pork spread containing onions and spices
 Fèves au lard—beans slow-cooked with bacon and maple syrup
Ketchup maison—green or red sauce made with sugar, vinegar, tomatoes, onions, apples and spices
 Soupe aux gourganes—soup showcasing the traditional gourgane bean
 Soupe à l'orge perlé—soup showcasing pearl barley
 Soupe aux pois—soup showcasing peas
 Oreilles de crisse—a dish consisting of deep-fried salted fatback
 Quiaude—a chowder that uses white fish

Main course 

Bouilli de légumes —a bouillon of traditional ingredients and spices
 Chiard—pork stew with potatoes and onions
 Cigares au chou—ground beef cabbage rolls with a homemade ketchup or tomato sauce coating
 Coquille Saint-Jacques —seafood chowder surrounded by mashed potatoes and covered with cheese
 Feuilleté jambon-fromage—rolled-up pastries with ham and cheese in the middle, looks like cinnamon buns
 Galette aux patates—potato pancake
 Gibelotte de Sorel—soup made with a tomato base, several vegetables and white fish, dish originally from Sorel-Tracy
 Guédille—lobster roll on a hotdog bun, can use other seafood instead of lobster
 Hot chicken—a chicken sandwich with gravy and peas served on top
 Pâté chinois—pâté consisting of a layer of ground beef at the bottom, either whole kernel or creamed corn in the centre and mashed potatoes on top
 Pizza-ghetti— a combination meal commonly found in fast food or family restaurants, another variety is the Pizza-caesar
 Pot-au-feu de la récolte—pork or beef pot-au-feu with traditional vegetables (ex. carrots, cabbage, etc.)
 Poulet chasseur—floured chicken cooked with certain vegetables and tomato sauce
 Poutine—french fries topped with cold or room temperature cheese curds and hot gravy, the most famous Québécois dish
 Poutine variants—variations on the classic poutine
  Ragoût de boulettes—a type of complex meatball ragoût
 Ragoût de pattes de cochon—a type of complex ragoût made using pig feet
 Tête fromagée—a solid structure made from a mix of pork, spices, onions, carrots and celery
 Souvlaki pita—the Québec version of the Gyros or Nova Scotian donair, largely inspired by 20th century Greek immigrants and today popular in many pizzerias and patateries
 Tourtière—pie usually made with minced pork or beef, a signature dish of the temps des fêtes
 Tourtière du Lac-Saint-Jean—a type of tourtière made with a thicker crust and with cubes of potatoes, meats and broth

Desserts 

 Beigne à l'ancienne—old-fashioned doughnuts
 Beigne aux patates—potato doughnuts
 Bonbons aux patates—potato candy
 Bûche de Noël—Yule log
 Galette à la mélasse—molasses pancake
 Gâteau Reine Élisabeth—type of cake made with dates, walnuts and coconut icing
 Gâteau au pain d'épices—cake made with certain spices
 Grands-pères—wrinkly ball-shaped cake often covered with maple syrup or stuffed with a fruit-based filling
 Pets de sœurs—rolled-up pastry with a brown sugar filling, looks like cinnamon buns
 Pouding chomeur—white cake laying in a maple-syrup based pudding
 Queue de castor—oval-shaped fried dough covered in a sweet garnish
 Sucre à la crème—cubes of sugar, condensed milk and butter, similar to Scottish tablets
 Tarte à la ferlouche—pie made with raisins, molasses and brown sugar
 Tarte au sucre—pie made from a sugar-based filling
 Tarte au suif—pie made from a sweet beef-fat based filling
 Tire de la Sainte-Catherine—a kind of sweet taffy, created to celebrate the Saint Catherine of Alexandria 
 Tire sur neige—boiling maple sap laid on snow and rolled up on a popsicle stick
 Trottoir—strawberry or blueberry-based pie whose upper crust has a pattern of rhombus-shaped holes

Drinks 

 Bière d'épinette—spruce beer
 Cidre de glace—ice cider
 Vin de glace—ice wine
 Caribou—drink made from red wine, a spirit and maple syrup

Poutine variants 

Poutine is arguably the most famous Québécois dish. The classic poutine is composed of fresh French fries and fresh cheese curds topped with hot brown gravy in a shallow bowl. The cheese curds are usually at room temperature to prevent them from melting and losing their elasticity or "squeakiness". Poutine emerged in the Centre-du-Québec area in the late 1950s. Its precise origins are uncertain as there are several cities and towns claiming to have invented the dish.

For many years, it was perceived negatively by English Canadians and mocked in English Canada. It was even used by some to stigmatize Québec society. But, it later became celebrated as a symbol of Québécois culture and the province of Québec. It has long been associated with Québec cuisine, and its rise in prominence has led to its popularity in the rest of Canada, in the northern United States, and internationally. Poutine has been called "Canada's national dish" though many believe this is cultural appropriation of Québécois and Québec's national identity, especially since Canada has mocked Québec for it, in the not-so-distant past. 

Because variants on the classic poutine have become widespread, many now consider poutine to be a dish class of its own. Some of the most commonly seen variants include chicken poutine (chicken is added), hot dog poutine (hot dog is added), pulled pork poutine (pulled pork is added), smoked meat poutine (Montréal smoked meat is added), galvaude poutine (adds peas and turkey, and is associated with maritime Québec), all-dressed poutine (adds ingredients to imitate an all-dressed pizza), "Italian" poutine (which replaces gravy with bolognese sauce), and lobster poutine (lobster is added and gravy is substituted). Menus who list variants on the classic poutine can vary wildly between restaurants. Establishments who specialise in poutines usually offer many variants and are called poutineries.

Cheeses 

When Canada was part of the French Empire, colonials used their Canadienne cattle to create a variety of soft, semi-soft and soft-ripened cheeses to eat. Following the Conquest of New France, the British began importing hard cheeses like Cheddar.

In the 1960s, the banning of crude milk made most of the old cheese-making techniques and recipes, which up to that point had been successfully passed on for centuries, disappear and become forgotten. Only a few recipes remain. The Saint-Pierre, produced on l'île d’Orléans, has the honour of being the oldest North American cheese. It is a soft-ripened cheese sold under the forms of la Faisselle, le Paillasson or le Raffiné. The Cailles cheese, a cheese made from fermented milk and typically used in salads, also used to be quite widespread. It now only exists in the Charlevoix and Saguenay-Lac-Saint-Jean regions.

Nowadays, there are attempts to diversify the ways in which Cailles is consumed. There are some cheeses that were also created by priests. Towards the end of the 19th century, a group of trappist monks were expelled from France and moved to Oka. One of them, who originated from Notre-Dame-du-Port-du-Salut, created a paste which was eventually used to mold the first Oka cheese. Benedictines were responsible for creating l’Ermite, a blue cheese, in 1943 at Saint-Benoît-du-Lac.

Today, Québec creates over 700 different kinds of cheeses and is the biggest cheese producer in Canada. Québecers enjoy many natively produced and imported hard cheeses, including hard cheeses parfumed by beer or wine. Most soft cheeses are produced locally and many are artisanal.

Maple syrup 

Québec produces 72% of the maple syrup sold on Earth and 90% of the maple syrup sold in Canada. Maple syrup is made from heated maple sap. The syrup is often used at breakfast to cover crêpes and pain doré, and as a component of fèves au lard. It can also be used to caramelize meats like ham, to stabilize the acidity of certain sauces, and to complement desserts like pouding-chômeur or grands-pères au sirop d'érable. It is the main ingredient showcased during le temps des sucres and in sugar shacks.

Many maple syrup-derived products exist. Tire, French for sugar on snow, is heated maple syrup that is cast onto a flat bed of snow and then rolled up onto a Popsicle stick to be eaten like candy. Tire is very popular at sugar shacks and during springtime.

Maple butter is a spread commonly used at breakfast on toast. Maple sugar can serve as a replacement to brown and white sugar. Maple water is not often consumed, but when it is, it is most often because it is believed to have health benefits.

Smoked meat 

In Québec, a meat-smoking technique called  boucanage is most often used to smoke meat.

Early French Canadian colonials learned this technique from Native Americans. Since the colonials discovered that it was useful for preserving food, they decided to start smoking their meat in the boucanage fashion, following their usual brining and/or spicing. This practice continued for centuries. Native Americans, on the other hand, continued to only boucaner their meat following their exchanges with the colonials and never started brining or spicing.

Today, Québecers still eat food that has been boucané, but for its taste rather than as a by-product of a food preservation technique. Establishments called boucanières or boucaneries are specialized in the boucanage process. On top of the traditional brining, spicing and smoking, modern boucanières can also use tree essences to infuse a certain taste in the meat, with maple wood being the most popular choice. A technique called boucaner à froid has also been developed; it involves drying fish and then suspending them over a fire. Boucaner à froid has always been popular in the Gaspesia, Bas-Saint-Laurent and Côte-Nord regions since fish were and are still commonly caught there. Atlantic herring, for example, was historically fished and exported in large quantities from these areas.

In the 1930s, Jewish immigrants came to Montréal and introduced their own Eastern European meat-smoking technique to Québec. This technique is often used today to make Montréal smoked meat, which is then often cut up in narrow slices to be added to dishes as an ingredient. Montréal smoked meat is also often spiced with Montréal steak spice and used to make Montréal smoked meat sandwiches.

Smoked salmon has become more popular in recent decades due to influence from the United States and Europe. Smoked pork's popularity has decreased and it is now almost exclusively consumed during Easter.

Cochonailles 
Pork-based charcuterie is traditionally referred to in Québec as cochonailles. Here are the most popular:
 Creton is composed of ground pork, lard (animal fat), milk and cereal that is cooked and flavoured together in order to obtain a creamy paste. Cretons are often eaten as a snack or breakfast on roasted bread pieces called rôties, along with mustard. If another kind of meat is used to create cretons, like poultry or veal, it is called cretonnade instead.
 Tête fromagée is less popular but used in the same way as cretons.
 The boudin of Québec is made of lard, milk, onions and pork blood. It is often served in a pan along with a sweet side or a sauce. Since 2018, the Goûte-Boudin de Boucherville association hands out a yearly prize for the best boudin.
 Plorines are composed of lard and flavoured meat enveloped in pork caul fat. Sometimes plorine recipes can also include eggs, beef and/or bread.
 Oreilles de Christ are lard pieces that are fried until they become crispy. They are eaten as an amuse-gueule and often with maple syrup as well.

Pastries 

Pastries produced in Québec include:
 Crêpes are flat and round, made from wheat or buckwheat flour. The crêpes of Québec are thicker than those from France, but not thick like pancakes of Anglo-Saxon cultures. They are popular breakfast items.  They are often served with maple syrup, brown sugar and/or fruits. They can also be served during lunch or supper.
 Beignes, which resemble old-fashioned doughnuts, are dough rings that were fried in oil. The doughnut holes are removed in order to create the ring, but they are baked and eaten as well. Powdered sugar or icing are often added on top after baking.
 Croquignoles are braided, twisted or rectangular fried dough pastries. They are a little less popular than beignes and can most often be found in rural regions.
 Pies are composed of a shortcrust exterior and an interior spread. Their most popular kinds of spread in Québec are fruit-based, like blueberry, apple, strawberry, or raspberry. Other popular kinds of pies include tarte au sucre, with a mixed butter and brown sugar spread, tarte à la farlouche, with a mixed brown sugar, molasses and dried raisins spread, and tarte au suif, which has beef fat as its spread.
 Sucre à la crème is a sugary snack composed of cream, brown sugar and butter. It can sometimes be found sold in convenience stores.
 Pets-de-sœur consist of a dough paste that is flattened and covered in a butter and brown sugar mix. The dough is then rolled over itself, cut to make a cylinder shape and then cut into thin slices.
 Chocolatines consist of small croissants with chocolate inside. They are sometimes sold in corner stores.
 Bûche de Noël is a wrapped cake pastry that is traditionally eaten during the holidays.
 Pouding chomeur is a white cake soaked in maple syrup or brown sugar.
 Grands-pères is a type of cake in the shape of a sphere which is eaten plain, or covered with maple syrup. They can also sometimes be filled with fruits. They are sometimes served as part of meals as well.

Regional foods 
Some regions of Québec are known for specific foods or products. Montréal is known for having created Montréal-style smoked meat, Montréal-style bagels, Montréal hot dogs (also called "steamies"), and Montréal melons. The Saguenay-Lac-Saint-Jean region is the birthplace of the tourtière du Lac-Saint-Jean, soupe aux gourganes and Saguenay Dry.

Maritime Quebec is known for its fish and seafood, and is a region where cipaille is often consumed during the holidays. Galvaude poutine (a poutine with peas and turkey) and Matane shrimp originate from Maritime Québec. Pot-en-pot des îles de la Madeleine is a well-known dish of the Magdellan Islands.

Some municipalities are associated with high-quality meat, such as duck from lake Brome or Charlevoix lamb.

Strains and breeds

Strains 

Over the centuries, varieties of fruits and vegetables were created in Québec. The need to cultivate Québec's strains has evaporated in recent times, causing most varieties to become lost. Here are some strains that have been saved or rediscovered:
 White Canadian corn
 The crotte-d’ours potato of Louis-Marie
 The Thibodeau bean of Saint-Jules
 The pomme Fameuse
 The Montréal melon
 The Mémé tomato of Beauce
 The potato onion
 Neuville corn

Breeds 
Though less numerous now, these breeds created in Québec are still used today:
 Canadienne cattle 
 Charlevoix lamb
 Chantecler chicken

References

Sources

Bibliography
  Anita Steward, Great Canadian Cuisine, Vancouver, Douglas & McIntyre, 1999, 192p.
  Cécile Roland Bouchard, L'Art culinaire au pays des bleuets et de la ouananiche, La Fondation culinaire régionale Saguenay-Lac-St-Jean, 1967, 245 p.
  Cercle de fermières de Cowansville, 100 recettes d'antan, Cowansville, Le Cercle, 1976, 112 p.
  Couillard, Suzette and Normand, Best Québec Recipes of Bygone Days , L'Islet: Éditions Suzette Couillard, 2002, 367 p..
  Émilienne Walker-Gagné, La Cuisine de mes grand'mères. Recettes d'autrefois, Montréal, Grandes éditions du Québec, 1974, 186 p.
  Gertrude Larouche, 350 ans au coin du four, 1989, 177 p..
  Hélène-Andrée Bizier, Cuisine traditionnelle des régions du Québec, Éditions de l'Homme, 1996.
  Hélène-Andrée Bizier and Robert-Lionel Séguin, Le Menu quotidien en Nouvelle-France, Art global, 2004, 124 p..
  Jacques Dorion, Le Québec en 101 saveurs. Historique des terroirs, produits des régions, recettes, meilleures adresses, Outremont, Trécarré, 2001, 144 p..
  Jacques Dorion, Saveurs des campagnes du Québec. La route des délices du terroir, Montréal, Éditions de l'Homme, 1997, 214 p..
  Jean-Marie Francœur, Encyclopédie de la cuisine de Nouvelle-France (1606-1763). Histoires, produits et recettes de notre patrimoine culinaire, Anjou (Québec), Fides, 2015, 590 p. (OCLC 914400153).
  Jean-Marie Francœur, Genèse de la cuisine québécoise. À travers ses grandes et ses petites histoires, Anjou, Québec, Fides, 2011.
  Jean-Paul Grappe, La Cuisine traditionnelle du Québec. Découvrez la cuisine de nos régions, Montréal, ITHQ-Éditions de l'Homme, 2006, 396 p..
  Julian Armstrong, A Taste of Québec. Second Edition, Toronto: Macmillan, 2001, 214 p.
  Julian Armstrong, Au goût du Québec, Saint-Laurent, Éditions du Trécarré, 1992, 218 p..
  Ken Haedrich et Suzanne P. Leclerc, Le Temps des sucres. 130 recettes à l'érable, Montréal, Éditions de l'Homme, 2003, 142 p..
  Lise Blouin, L'Alimentation traditionnelle à l'île d'Orléans, Québec, Éditions Garneau, 1977, 156 p..
  Martin Fournier, Jardins et potagers en Nouvelle-France. Joie de vivre et patrimoine culinaire, Sillery, Septentrion, 2004, 242 p..
  Michel Lambert, Histoire de la cuisine familiale du Québec, vol. 1 : Ses origines autochtones et européennes, Québec, Les Éditions GID, 2007, 504 p..
  Michel Lambert, Histoire de la cuisine familiale du Québec, vol. 2 : La Mer, ses régions et ses produits, des origines à aujourd’hui, Québec, Les Éditions GID, 2007, 912 p..
  Michèle Serre, Les Produits du marché au Québec, Outremont, Éditions du Trécarré, 2005, 527 p..
  Micheline Mongrain-Dontigny, A Taste of Maple : History and Recipes, Saint-Irénée: Éditions La Bonne recette, 2003, 127 p.
  Micheline Mongrain-Dontigny, Traditional Québec Cooking : A Treasure of Heirloom Recipes, La Tuque : Éditions La Bonne recette, 1995, 156 p.
  Micheline Mongrain-Dontigny, L'Érable, son histoire, sa cuisine, Saint-Jean-sur-Richelieu, Éditions La Bonne recette, 2003, 127 p..
  Micheline Mongrain-Dontigny, La Cuisine traditionnelle des Cantons-de-l'Est, Saint-Jean-sur-Richelieu, Éditions La Bonne recette, 2002, 188 p..
  Micheline Mongrain-Dontigny, La Cuisine traditionnelle de Charlevoix, La Tuque, Éditions La Bonne recette, 1996, 177 p..
  Micheline Mongrain-Dontigny, La Cuisine traditionnelle de la Mauricie. Un patrimoine culinaire à découvrir, Montréal, Éditions La Bonne recette, 1998, 181 p..
  Olwen Woodier and Suzanne P. Leclerc (traduction de Françoise Schetagne), Le Temps du maïs. 140 succulentes recettes, Montréal, Éditions de l'Homme, 2003, 186 p..
  Olwen Woodier and Suzanne P. Leclerc (traduction de Françoise Schetagne), Le Temps des pommes. 150 délicieuses recettes, Montréal, Éditions de l'Homme, 2002, 206 p..
  Paul-Louis Martin, Les Fruits du Québec. Histoire et traditions des douceurs de la table, Sillery, Septentrion, 2002, 224 p..
 
  Richard Bizier and Roch Nadeau, Célébrer le Québec gourmand. Cuisine et saveurs du terroir, Outremont, Trécarré, 2003, 126 p..
  Richard Bizier and Roch Nadeau, Recettes traditionnelles du temps des fêtes, Outremont, Trécarré, 2006, 176 p..
  Richard Bizier and Roch Nadeau, Le Répertoire des fromages du Québec, Outremont, Trécarré, 2002, 384 p..
  Richard Trottier, Claude Morneau et Pascale Couture, La Cuisine régionale au Québec, Montréal, Éditions Ulysse, 1999, 206 p..
  Roseline Normand and Suzette Couillard, La Bonne Table d'antan, Saint-Eugène, L'Islet, Éditions S.R., 1982, 361 p..
  Roseline Normand and Suzette Couillard, Cuisine traditionnelle d'un Québec oublié, L'Islet, Québec, 1981, 326 p..
  Sœur Sainte-Marie-Vitaline, 235 recettes pour dîners et soupers. Exercices pratiques d'art culinaire, Congrégation de Notre-Dame de Montréal, 1942, 80 p.
  Sœur Berthe, Les techniques culinaires, Montréal, Éditions de l'Homme, 1978, 275 p..
  Vincent Demester, La Cuisine des premiers migrants du Québec. Enquête sur la disparition du patrimoine culinaire du Poitou-Charentes, Paris (France), L'Harmattan, coll. « Questions alimentaires et gastronomiques », 2014, 250 p..

 
Culture of Quebec